Amesiodendron is a genus of plant in family Sapindaceae. It contains the following species (but this list may be incomplete):
 Amesiodendron chinense (Merr.) Hu

 
Taxonomy articles created by Polbot
Sapindaceae genera